The 2012 UC Davis football team represented the University of California, Davis as a member of the Big Sky Conference during the 2012 NCAA Division I FCS football season. Led by Bob Biggs in his 20th and final season as head coach, UC Davis compiled an overall record of 4–7 with a mark of 3–5 in conference play, placing in three-way tie for eighth in the Big Sky. The Aggies played home games at Aggie Stadium in Davis, California.

Schedule

Game summaries

Azusa Pacific

@ San Jose State

@ South Dakota State

@ Cal Poly

Weber State

Montana State

@ Idaho State

@ Northern Arizona

Portland State

@ Eastern Washington

Sacramento State

References

UC Daivs
UC Davis Aggies football seasons
UC Davis Aggies football